Geocaryum is a genus of flowering plants belonging to the family Apiaceae.

Its native range is Northwestern Africa, Southeastern Europe to Turkey.

Species:

Geocaryum capillifolium 
Geocaryum pumilum

References

Apioideae